The Favourite is a 2018 historical period comedy film directed by Yorgos Lanthimos, from a screenplay written by Deborah Davis and Tony McNamara. Taking place in the early 18th century, the story focuses on the rivalry between the Duchess of Marlborough (Rachel Weisz) and her younger cousin, Abigail Hill (Emma Stone), to be court favourites during the reign of Queen Anne (Olivia Colman) at the height of the War of the Spanish Succession. Nicholas Hoult, Joe Alwyn, James Smith, and Mark Gatiss feature in supporting roles. Sandy Powell designed the costumes; the cinematographer was Robbie Ryan.

It had its world premiere at the 75th Venice International Film Festival on 30 August 2018, where it won two awards: the Grand Jury Prize and the Volpi Cup for Best Actress (for Colman). It was released in the United States on 23 November 2018, by Fox Searchlight Pictures.  Its opening $105,603 per-theater average was the highest opening average of the year. The film became a critical and commercial success, grossing $53.1 million on a $15 million budget, and has received critical acclaim, with particular praise given to its screenplay and direction, cinematography, editing, costume design, production values, music, and its three lead performances. Review aggregator Rotten Tomatoes surveyed 371 reviews and judged 93% of them to be positive. Metacritic calculated a weighted average score of 90/100 based on 53 reviews, indicating "universal acclaim". The Favourite was Metacritic's twelfth-best-reviewed film of 2018.

The Favourite won a record-breaking ten awards from thirteen nominations at the 2018 British Independent Film Awards, including Best Picture; Best Supporting Actress (Weisz); Best Director; Best Screenplay, and Best Actress for Colman, maintaining her record of winning each time she has been nominated. The film has received the most nominations at the 72nd British Academy Film Awards—including for Best Film, Best Direction, Best Actress in a Leading Role (Colman), Best Actress in a Supporting Role (both Stone and Weisz) and Best British Film. With ten nominations, it tied with Roma as the most-nominated film at the 91st Academy Awards. It was nominated for five Golden Globe Awards at the 76th ceremony, winning Best Actress – Motion Picture Comedy or Musical for Colman. It was ranked by the American Film Institute as one of the top 10 films of 2018.

Accolades

Notes

See also
 2018 in film

References

External links 
 

Lists of accolades by film